Richard Jacob Evans (May 31, 1915 – May 26, 2008) was an American professional basketball and football player. Evans was born on May 31, 1915 in Chicago, Illinois.

Professional athlete

Basketball
Evans played for four teams in the National Basketball League between the 1940–41 and 1942–43 seasons: the Hammond Ciesar All-Americans, Sheboygan Red Skins, Chicago Bruins, and Chicago Studebaker Flyers. In 32 career games played he averaged 2.4 points per game.

Football
Evans also played with the Green Bay Packers during the 1940 NFL season and the 1943 NFL season. During the two season in between, he played with the Chicago Cardinals.

Coach
Between 1952 and 1972, he was a coach, usually a defensive coach, for several NFL teams.

References

1915 births
2008 deaths
American men's basketball players
United States Marine Corps personnel of World War II
Basketball players from Chicago
Centers (basketball)
Chicago Bruins players
Chicago Cardinals players
Chicago Studebaker Flyers players
Forwards (basketball)
Green Bay Packers coaches
Green Bay Packers players
Hammond Ciesar All-Americans players
Iowa Hawkeyes football players
Iowa Hawkeyes men's basketball players
Players of American football from Chicago
Sheboygan Red Skins players